Noël Robin Ott (born 15 January 1994) is a Swiss beach soccer player who plays as a forward.

Known for his pace across the sand and technical abilities in scoring many goals, Ott came to prominence in the sport in 2014, excelling during the European season; he was named best young player in the world that year. He followed this up by claiming the Bronze Ball at the 2015 FIFA Beach Soccer World Cup. Ott has since been described as an "indispensable" part of the Swiss national team and one of the "5 to 10 best players in the world", something that was officially recognised in 2017 as he was named as part of the world team of the year.

He is regularly referred to as the "Lionel Messi of beach soccer".

Biography

Early life
Ott was born in Sattel, Switzerland and raised in Wettingen of Aargau canton. Ott's father, a former amateur of the Swiss third division, inspired him to play association football as a child at six years old. Ott joined Swiss Super League side Grasshoppers as a youth in 2007 and advanced through their junior teams from the under-13s onwards. Meanwhile, aged 9, Ott had begun attending Swiss Beach Soccer youth camps. He was originally tutored by Stephan Meir and Moritz Jaggy, members of the Swiss national team Ott would ultimately play alongside of. He continued to be present at the training camps over the next decade. As a youth, it was clear to Swiss coach Angelo Schirinzi that Ott was a talented beach soccer player.

Career
Ott's prospects of becoming a professional footballer were dashed as he was rejected from progressing to Grasshoppers' upper youth teams. Following this rejection, Franziska Steinemann, future coach of the Switzerland women’s team and a friend of Ott's mother, invited him to play with club side Havana Shots Aargau of the Suzuki Swiss National Beach Soccer League. Ott debuted in the National League in 2009, aged 15. Initially, Ott attempted to continue his football career, joining FC Baden of the Swiss fourth tier for a year whilst also playing for Havana Shots; he made rapid progress with the latter. In his second season with Aargau in 2011, Ott was named "rookie of the year" and in the 2012 season, he was named best player and was the league's top scorer.

Following his performances in the National League, Ott was called up to the Swiss national team and, aged 18, made his debut against Brazil in the 2012 Intercontinental Cup in November. At this point it was firmly in Ott's mind that beach soccer was his priority. Beach Soccer Worldwide (BSWW) described 2014 as Ott's breakout season, confirming him as a "star". But, after winning the MVP award at the 2014 Euro Beach Soccer League Superfinal in August, Ott suffered a serious injury at the 2015 World Cup qualifiers a month later, tearing two knee ligaments, his anterior cruciate (ACL) and medial collateral (MCL), as well as tearing his meniscus. This sidelined Ott for several months. Despite this, Ott was nominated as one of the best three players in the world at the inaugural Beach Soccer Stars awards in November and was also bestowed with the "rising star award" for best young player, aged 20.

He recovered in time for the 2015 World Cup, his first World Cup, in which he was joint top scorer with eight goals, claiming the Bronze Ball award. In 2015, he also moved from Havana Shots back to his childhood club of Grasshoppers, this time their beach soccer branch, having been persuaded by Swiss colleague Dejan Stankovic. Ott represented FC Barcelona in 2015; Ott began to find that he was frequently being compared to football star Lionel Messi, with both having played for Barcelona, being small in stature, technically agile, frequent goalscorers and wearers of the number 10 jersey. He has since gone on to play for other clubs outside of Switzerland including Catania (Italy), Pisa (Italy), Lokomotiv Moscow (Russia), CSKA Moscow (Russia), Botofogo (Brazil), Sporting CP (Portugal), Artur Music (Ukraine) and Falfala Kfar Qassem (Israel). At the 2017 Beach Soccer Stars awards, Ott was named as part of the world team of the year.

In 2019, he won the Swiss National League for the first time with Grasshoppers and earned his first commendation with the Swiss national team, the bronze medal at the 2019 European Games.

Ott tore his meniscus for a second time in September 2020, this time playing football for SC Zofingen. This time the injury required surgery which took place a month later. This ruled out Ott from playing until at least spring 2021.

Style of play
Ott has described himself as a "whirlwind" who "spins past opponents" and likes to "go one-on-one with opposition players". His pace is also frequently referenced as his strength, with an ability to glide quickly across the pitch without his feet sinking into the soft sand surface. Ott is also known for his exceptional technical abilities.

Personal life
In 2013, Ott gained a bachelor's degree in economics. In 2015 he was working as an office administrator in Zürich and would subsequently drive to Basel to train with the national team. His employer of the time fired Ott in 2017 as they were unwilling to accommodate Ott's need to dedicate so much time to beach soccer.

Cristiano Ronaldo is his idol. Within beach soccer, he looks up to Portuguese brothers Leo and Be Martins but says the most important people in his career have been Swiss coach Angelo Schirinzi and teammate Dejan Stankovic.

Statistics

Honours
The following is a selection, not an exhaustive list, of the major international honours Ott has achieved:

Team
Euro Winners Cup runner-up (1): 2016

UEFA qualifiers for the FIFA Beach Soccer World Cup runner-up (2): 2014, 2016

Euro Beach Soccer League runner-up (1): 2020

Euro Beach Soccer Cup runner-up (1): 2014

European Games bronze medal (1): 2019

Individual

FIFA Beach Soccer World Cup (1):
Bronze Shoe: 2015

Beach Soccer Stars (3):
Rising Star: 2014
World's top 3 best players: 2014
World dream team: 2017

UEFA qualifiers for the FIFA Beach Soccer World Cup (1):
Top scorer: 2021

Euro Beach Soccer Cup (1):
Top scorer: 2014

Euro Beach Soccer League (8):
Superfinal:
Best player: 2014
Top scorer: 2017
Regular season stages:
Best player: 2014 x1, 2015 x1
Top scorer: 2014 x1, 2016 x1, 2018 x2

References

External links
Noel Ott, profile at Beach Soccer Worldwide
Noel Ott, profile at Swiss Football Association (in German)
Noel Ott, profile at Beach Soccer Russia (in Russian)
Noël Ott, profile at ZeroZero.pt (in Portuguese)

1994 births
Living people
Swiss men's footballers
Swiss beach soccer players
Association football forwards
European Games bronze medalists for Switzerland
Beach soccer players at the 2015 European Games
European Games medalists in beach soccer
Beach soccer players at the 2019 European Games
Sportspeople from the canton of Schwyz